Harry Herbert Miller (May 4, 1879 – March 12, 1968) was a United States Navy sailor and a recipient of America's highest military decoration—the Medal of Honor—for his actions in the Spanish–American War.

Biography

Harry Miller enlisted in the U.S. Navy from the state of Massachusetts and served during the Spanish–American War on board  (Gunboat #7). On May 11, 1898, he was one of several men who took part in a boat expedition that cut the underwater telegraph cable off Cienfuegos, Cuba. For his "extraordinary bravery and coolness" under enemy fire during this operation (the Battle of Cienfuegos), Miller was awarded the Medal of Honor. His brother, Willard Miller, also participated in the battle and was awarded the Medal of Honor, making the two men one of only eight pairs of brothers to have received the medal. He attained the rank of Quartermaster Third Class before leaving the service. He eventually moved to Costa Rica, where he died at the age of 88.

Medal of Honor citation
Rank and organization: Seaman, U.S. Navy. 
Place and date: On board the U.S.S. Nashville, Cienfuegos, Cuba, May 11, 1898. 
Entered service at: Massachusetts. Born: May 4, 1879, Noel Shore, Nova Scotia in Hants County. 
G.O. No.: 521, July 7, 1899.

Citation:

On board the U.S.S. Nashville, during the operation of cutting the cable leading from Cienfuegos, Cuba, 11 May 1898. Facing the heavy fire of the enemy, Miller displayed extraordinary bravery and coolness throughout this action.

See also
 List of Medal of Honor recipients
 List of Medal of Honor recipients for the Spanish–American War

References

 

1879 births
1968 deaths
American military personnel of the Spanish–American War
Burials in Costa Rica
Canadian people of British descent
United States Navy Medal of Honor recipients
People from Hants County, Nova Scotia
United States Navy sailors
Canadian-born Medal of Honor recipients
American emigrants to Costa Rica
Spanish–American War recipients of the Medal of Honor
Canadian emigrants to the United States